Joseph Edgar Brown (February 11, 1880 – June 13, 1939) was a U.S. Representative from Tennessee. He was the son of Foster Vincent Brown and Lula (Farrior) Brown.

Biography
Born in Jasper, Tennessee, Brown attended Baylor School in Chattanooga, and graduated from Cumberland University, Lebanon, Tennessee, in 1902 where he studied law at Cumberland School of Law. He was admitted to the Tennessee bar in 1904 and commenced practice in Jasper. He moved to Chattanooga in 1907 and continued the practice of law. He married Hester Jefferson McClain.

Career
Brown was elected as a Republican to the Sixty-seventh Congress (March 4, 1921 – March 3, 1923),  representing Tennessee's 3rd district. He was not a candidate for renomination in 1922.

After leaving Congress, Brown served as chairman of the Republican State executive committee from 1922 to 1924 and resumed the practice of law in Chattanooga. He served as delegate to the Republican National Convention in 1924.

Death
Brown died in Charleston on June 13, 1939, (age 59 years, 122 days) and is interred in Forest Hills Cemetery.

References

External links

1880 births
1939 deaths
People from Jasper, Tennessee
Politicians from Chattanooga, Tennessee
Republican Party members of the United States House of Representatives from Tennessee
20th-century American politicians